List of United States Hockey League award winners.

Player awards

USHL Player of the Year

USHL Rookie of the Year

Forward of the Year

Defenseman of the Year

Goaltender of the Year

Curt Hammer Award 
Awarded to an USHL player for on and off the ice participation.

Dave Tyler Junior Player of the Year Award 
The Dave Tyler Junior Player of the Year Award is awarded to the top junior player in USA Hockey, but is not necessarily an USHL award. Those listed are only the USHL players that have won the award.

Staff awards

Coach of the Year

General Manager of the Year

Organization of the Year

References

Sources
 USHL 2006–07 Media Guide
 Awards at USHL.com

United States Hockey League trophies and awards